Nagla Tula is a village in Rajasthan, India. Administratively, it is under Rudawal ILRC, Roopwas Tehsil, Bharatpur District, Rajasthan. The village has a population of about a thousand.

In May 2013, during a heat wave, a fire in Nagla Tula burned a large portion of the village.

Notes

External links 
 

Villages in Bharatpur district